George M. Parker may refer to:

 George Parker (cricketer) (George Macdonald Parker, 1899–1969), South African cricketer
 George M. Parker (general) (1889–1968), United States Army general